User Friendly is a webcomic.

User Friendly may also refer to:

 Usability, the ease of using a given object
 User Friendly (horse), a British Thoroughbred racehorse
 User Friendly, a short story collection by Spider Robinson
 "User Friendly", a song by Marilyn Manson on the album Mechanical Animals
 "User-Friendly", a song by Ian Anderson on the album Walk into Light
 User Friendly (film), a 1990 New Zealand film